Ralph L. "Sporty" Carpenter (August 6, 1930 – February 16, 1990) was an American football and baseball coach. He served as the head football coach at Henderson State University in Arkadelphia, Arkansas from 1971 to 1989, compiling a record of 119–76–5. Carpenter was also the head baseball coach at Henderson State from 1970 to 1975, tallying a mark of 106–68.

A native of Hamburg, Arkansas, Carpenter played college football at Henderson State from 1954 to 1956 under head coach Duke Wells.  He returned to Henderson State in 1967 as assistant football coach. Carpenter died on February 16, 1990, at a hospital in Memphis, Tennessee from complications of a liver transplant.

Head coaching record

Football

References

External links
 

1930 births
1990 deaths
Henderson State Reddies baseball coaches
Henderson State Reddies football coaches
Henderson State Reddies football players
People from Hamburg, Arkansas
Players of American football from Arkansas